2NZ is an Australian radio station serving the Inverell region. The station began broadcasting on 30 March 1936 under the original callsign of 2LV.  In January 1937, after a request to increase broadcast power was approved, the callsign of the station was changed to 2NZ.

References

Radio stations in New South Wales
Radio stations established in 1937
News and talk radio stations in Australia
Classic hits radio stations in Australia
Broadcast Operations Group

External links
Official web site
Official web site